The Champions Sprint, registered as the Victoria Racing Club Stakes, is a Victoria Racing Club Group One  Thoroughbred horse race for horses aged three years old and over, under weight for age conditions, over a distance of 1200 metres held at Flemington Racecourse, Melbourne, Australia on the last day of the VRC Spring Carnival. Total prize money for the race is A$3,000,000.

History

The race is considered one of the major sprints of the spring racing calendar. Prior to 2006 the race was held on the first day of the VRC Spring Carnival, Victoria Derby day, but was moved the following year to the last day of the carnival.  In 2007 the sprint was also changed to weight-for-age conditions.

Name
1960–1979 - Craven 'A' Stakes 
1980–1984 - Pure-Pak Stakes 
1985–1993 - Gadsden Stakes 
1994–1995 - Southcorp Packaging Stakes 
1996–2006 - Salinger Stakes
2007 - The Age Classic
2008–2012 -  Patinack Farm Classic
2013 - VRC Sprint Classic
2014–2017 - Darley Classic
2018 - VRC Sprint Classic
2019–2021 - Darley Sprint Classic
2022– Darley Champions Sprint

Distance
1960–1971 - 6 furlongs (~1200 metres)
1972 onwards -  1200 metres

Grade
1960–1978 -  Principal Race
1979 onwards -  Group 1

Winners

2022 - Roch 'n' Horse
2021 - Nature Strip
2020 - Bivouac
2019 - Nature Strip
2018 - Santa Ana Lane
2017 - Redzel
2016 - Malaguerra
2015 - Delectation
2014 - Terravista
2013 - Buffering
2012 - Mental
2011 - Black Caviar
2010 - Black Caviar
2009 - All Silent
2008 - Swick
2007 - Miss Andretti
2006 - Dance Hero
2005 - Glamour Puss
2004 - Takeover Target
2003 - Ancient Song
2002 - Rubitano
2001 - Sudurka
2000 - Easy Rocking
1999 - Pharein
1998 - Flavour
1997 - Notoire
1996 - Gold Ace
1995 - Brawny Spirit
1994 - Hareeba
1993 - Alishan
1992 - Unspoken Word
1991 - Final Card
1990 - Planet Ruler
1989 - Planet Ruler
1988 - Special
1987 - Sky Filou
1986 - Taj Quillo
1985 - Lord Ballina
1984 - River Rough
1983 - River Rough
1982 - Forgone Conclusion
1981 - Zegna
1980 - Watney
1979 - Rooney
1978 - Always Welcome
1977 - Galway Bay
1976 - Maybe Mahal
1975 - Miss Lockleys
1974 - Scamanda
1973 - Century
1972 - Beaches
1971 - Welsh Prince
1970 - Dual Choice
1969 - Vain
1968 - Snub
1967 - Iga Ninja
1966 - Marmion
1965 - Picca
1964 - Star Of Heaven
1963 - Ripa
1962 - Samson
1961 - Bengal Tiger
1960 - Karina

See also
 List of Australian Group races
 Group races

References

Group 1 stakes races in Australia
Flemington Racecourse